Mario Gutiérrez may refer to:
Mario Gutiérrez (politician), former leader of the Bolivian Socialist Falange
Mario Gutierrez (jockey), Mexican jockey